The Circle of Homosexual Culture "Mario Mieli" (Italian: Circolo di cultura omosessuale Mario Mieli)  is an association founded in Rome in 1983 to defend the civil rights of LGBT people and dedicated to gay writer and activist Mario Mieli.

It is an independent association based on volunteering: it deals with the claim and protection of the civil rights of LGBTQ people (lesbian, gay, bisexual, transgender, queer) and promotes cultural activities and socialization.

In this regard, it is actively fighting against homophobic and transphobic prejudice in the field of civil rights and a culture of differences, including pressures on mass media, parties and institutions, in order to change the discriminatory attitude towards both sexual orientation and identity Of gender.

They are also actively involved in the fight against AIDS, organizing awareness campaigns and helping patients. For a long time it is also a solid point of reference for knowledge and socialization among LGBTQ people, as it offers a "welcome" service that takes place once a week at the club headquarters.

History 
The association was founded in 1983 by the fusion of pre-existing Roman organizations, F.U.O.R.I. Roma (Outside)  and Collettivo Narciso (Narcissus Collective).

Since 1989, first in Rome, Circolo Mario Mieli offers home-based care for people suffering from aids, formed by a staff of practitioners, psychologists and social workers. It also offers psychological counselling services, legal assistance, telephone counselling, self-help groups for HIV-positive people. It manages a family home for homeless people.

Since 1994 it is the organizer of the annual LGBT Pride event in Rome. In 1995, it joined the EPOA (European Pride Organisers Association), by initiative of its President at the time, Imma Battaglia, and got to host in 2000 the World Pride, the world premiere of LGBT pride, culminating in a great parade Parade on the streets of capital on 7 July 2000. The Circle Mario Mieli was also the official organizer of Europride in Rome in 2011 .

From 1994 to 2011 they published the monthly magazine Aut, distributed throughout the country.

The club hosts the "Marco Sanna" Documentation Centre, dedicated to a historical activist who played in the association; The documentation center is made up of books, papers, periodicals, newspaper articles, photographs and audio-visual material, preserving the history of the LGBT Roman and national movement from the seventies to the present. In 2010, the Vinicio Diamanti Fund was set up, dedicated to the actor, star of travesty of the avanspettacolo, following a donation from the family. The background collects photographs, books, documents, correspondence, theater and cinematographic materials, dresses and costumes.

The chairmen of the Circle were: Bruno Di Donato, Vanni Piccolo, Andrea Pini, Pino Anastasi, Deborah Di Cave, Imma Battaglia (1995 to 2000), Massimo Mazzotta (from 2000 to 2004), Rossana Praitano (2004-2009), Andrea Maccarrone (for only two months in 2009), Rossana Praitano (from 2009 to October 2012), Andrea Maccarrone (from 2012 to 2015), Mario Colamarino (from 2015 to 2017) and Sebastiano F. Secci elected in October 2017.

On 3 August 2017 the circle announced that it had submitted its application to organize the World Pride 2025, 25 years after the first, in Rome.

References 

LGBT organisations in Italy
LGBT history in Italy